Huaylas may refer to the following:

Huaylas Province - a province in the Ancash Region in Central Peru
Huaylas District - a district in the Huaylas Province
Huaylas, Peru - a town in the Huaylas District
Callejón de Huaylas - the valley of Río Santa in the Ancash Region